Aliso Creek may refer to:

Aliso Creek (Orange County)
Aliso Canyon
Aliso Creek (Los Angeles County), also called Aliso Canyon Wash

See also
 Aliso (disambiguation)
 Aliso Canyon (disambiguation)